Love of Women is a 1924 American silent drama film directed by Whitman Bennett and starring Helene Chadwick, Montagu Love, and Maurice Costello.

Synopsis
An unscrupulous millionaire schemes to break up a marriage with the aid of a vamp.

Cast

Preservation
With no prints of Love of Women located in any film archives, it is a lost film.

References

Bibliography
 Munden, Kenneth White. The American Film Institute Catalog of Motion Pictures Produced in the United States, Part 1. University of California Press, 1997.

External links

1924 films
1924 drama films
Silent American drama films
Films directed by Whitman Bennett
American silent feature films
1920s English-language films
American black-and-white films
Selznick Pictures films
1920s American films